José Miguel Pérez Saint Martin (born José Miguel Pérez Saint Martin; 17 September 1993) is a Mexican actor. He is best known for his role in the sitcom La familia P. Luche (2002–2012). He is also a director of the INPODE (Instituto Poblano del Deporte y Juventud).

References

External links

1993 births
Living people
Mexican male child actors
Mexican male telenovela actors
Mexican male television actors